Holy is a synonym for sacred.

Holy or Holiness may also refer to:

 Holiness movement, a specific tradition within evangelicalism
 Holiness (style), a pre-nominal honorific used for the leaders of several religious groups
 Holiness code, found in the Bible at Leviticus 17–26

People
 Holý, a Czech surname
 Mirela Holy, a Croatian politician

Books
 The Holy, a novel by Daniel Quinn
 "Holy" (short story), a short story by Orson Scott Card

Television
 "Holy" (Bottom), an episode of the British sitcom Bottom
 "Holy...", an exclamation by Robin, originating from the Batman 1966 television series

Music
 Holy (In Strict Confidence album)
 Holy (U.D.O. album)
 "Holy Holy", a 1971 song by David Bowie
 "(One Glance Is) Holy", a 1989 song by Mike Oldfield
 "Holy" (Justin Bieber song), a 2020 song by Justin Bieber featuring Chance the Rapper.
 "Holy", a 2017 song by Kayzo and Slander from Dilapidation Celebration
 "Holy", a 2014 song by Pvris from White Noise
 "H.O.L.Y.", a 2016 song by Florida Georgia Line
 "Holy...", a 1997 song by Sadist from Crust
 "THE HOLY", a 2018 track by Toby Fox from Deltarune Chapter 1 OST from the video game Deltarune

See also
 
 Holi
 Q-D-Š, Semitic triliteral root meaning "holy"
 List of people known as the Holy

no:Hellighet
nn:Heilag